Quinak-e Rakhshani (also Romanized as Qū’īnak-e Rakhshānī; also known as Qa‘leh Quinak, Qal‘eh-ye Qūīnak, Qū’īnak, Qū’īnak-e Sūkhteh, and Qūnīk) is a village in Tarand Rural District, Jalilabad District, Pishva County, Tehran Province, Iran. At the 2006 census, its population was 474, in 97 families.

References 

Populated places in Pishva County